Thirty Days is a 1922 American silent comedy film produced by Famous Players-Lasky and distributed by Paramount Pictures. The film is a farce based on the play Thirty Days by A. E. Thomas and Clayton Hamilton which did not make it to Broadway.

The film was directed by James Cruze and stars idol Wallace Reid in his last screen performance. Reviews of the film claimed Reid looked tired and haggard throughout the production and garnered generally bad reviews. This is now considered a lost film.

Plot
As described in a film publication, because of his flirtatious tendencies, young and wealthy society man John Floyd (Reid) is put on 30 days' probation by his sweetheart Lucille Ledyard (Hawley). She gets him to assist her in settlement work. He ends up soothing Carlotta (Phillips), a young woman in a tough Italian section, when her husband Giacomo Polenta (Mayall) comes home and chases John with a knife. John escapes, but Giacomo, who is wanted by the police, takes a job as a butler in the Floyd home until he has a chance to skip to Italy. Carlotta comes to warn John, but Giacomo sees her and chases her down the street with a carving knife until he is nabbed by a police officer. Judge Hooker (Ogle), a friend of the Floyds', suggests that John seek safety in jail for 30 days until Giacomo leaves for Italy, so John goes and assaults a friend and rival, is arrested, and sent to jail by the judge. In jail he runs into Giacomo but is able to escape him. Giacomo is released, but waits for John outside the prison. Lucille and a friend visit John. When released, John is tied up by some criminals and put on a steamer headed for Italy. In the end, John and Lucille are reconciled.

Cast
Wallace Reid as John Floyd
Wanda Hawley as Lucille Ledyard
Charles Ogle as Judge Hooker
Cyril Chadwick as Huntley Palmer
Herschel Mayall as Giacomo Polenta
Helen Dunbar as Mrs. Floyd
Carmen Phillips as Carlotta
Kalla Pasha as Warden
Robert Brower as Professor Huxley

See also
Wallace Reid filmography

References

External links

Lantern slide for the film (WaybackMachine)

1922 films
Films directed by James Cruze
American silent feature films
American films based on plays
Lost American films
Famous Players-Lasky films
American black-and-white films
1922 lost films
1920s American films